Claudio Grassi (born 25 July 1985) is an Italian tennis player playing on the ATP Challenger Tour. On 22 August 2011, he reached his highest ATP singles ranking of World No. 300 and his highest doubles ranking of No. 137 achieved on 4 November 2013.

Tour titles

Doubles

External links
 
 

1985 births
People from Carrara
Living people
Italian male tennis players
Sportspeople from the Province of Massa-Carrara
21st-century Italian people